Beretta's Island is a 1993 American direct-to-video action film directed by Michael Preece and starring Franco Columbu.

Plot
A retired Interpol officer tries to bring down the drug lord who killed his friend and threatens an entire village on the island of Sardinia.

Cast

 Franco Columbu as Franco Armando Beretta 
 Arnold Schwarzenegger as himself 
 Ken Kercheval as Barone  
 Elizabeth Kaitan as Linda  
 Van Quattro as Johnny Carrera  
 Jo Champa as Celeste  
 Leslie Ming as Sly  
 Audrey Brunner as Tina  
 Dimitri Logothetis as Interpol agent  
 Buck Holland as Father Pastore

Production
Franco Columbu is a former Mr. Olympia and Arnold Schwarzenegger plays an old weight-training friend.

See also
 List of American films of 1993

References

External links 
 
 

1993 films
1993 action films
1993 crime films
1993 direct-to-video films
1990s American films
1990s crime action films
1990s English-language films
American crime action films
Direct-to-video action films
Direct-to-video crime films
Films shot in Sardinia
Films set in Sardinia